Hegna is a surname. Notable people with the surname include:

Bent Hegna (born 1959), Norwegian politician
Collin Hegna, American musician, composer, and recording engineer
Trond Hegna (1898–1992), Norwegian author, journalist, and editor